The Giddings-Burnham House is a historic house in Ipswich, Massachusetts. The house was probably built in the 1640s by George Giddings and was sold to his brother-in-law Thomas Burnham. The earliest documentation for this property was the deed of sale between George Giddings and Thomas Burnham in 1667 negating previous thoughts that the house was not built until 1680. The original house has been expanded and renovated and has a plaque on the door from the Ipswich Historical Commission stating that the home was built before 1667 by George Giddings.

The house was listed on the National Register of Historic Places in 1990.

See also
George Giddings House and Barn
Burnham-Patch House, also owned by Thomas Burnham
James Burnham House, owned by Burnham's son
National Register of Historic Places listings in Ipswich, Massachusetts
National Register of Historic Places listings in Essex County, Massachusetts

References
Giddings, R. (1984). Ipswich to Fort Collins: The Giddings Family, 1635-1985. Parkview Publishing Co.

Houses in Ipswich, Massachusetts
National Register of Historic Places in Ipswich, Massachusetts
1680 establishments in Massachusetts
Houses on the National Register of Historic Places in Essex County, Massachusetts